Anna K may refer to:

Anna K (designer) (born 1995), Ukrainian fashion designer
Anna K (singer) (born 1965), Czech singer
Anna K. or Anna Kjellberg, bassist for Drain STH and Revolting Cocks